Victory inscription pillar of Namjani Borphukan or Barphukanar Jayasthamba, is a stone pillar inscription, records the defeat of the Mughals in the Conquest of Guwahati by the Ahoms in 1667 A.D. This inscription erolls the qualities of Namjani Barphukan or Lachit Barphukan, son of Borbarua. It was inscribed in randhra-vajra-vana chandra, saka 1589 after the victory over the Yavanas (The Muslims).

The rock inscription was discovered in Fatasil, in the south Guwahati. The pillar measures 41 inches in height and 53 and half inches in girth, is now preseved in Assam State Museum.

Notes

References 

Monumental columns in India
Indian inscriptions
India
 
Sculptures in India
Indian architectural history
Outdoor sculptures in India
Archaeological artifacts of India
History of Assam
Assam
 
Assamese inscriptions